Ujilica is a mountain in the municipality of Grahovo, Bosnia and Herzegovina. It is the northernmost part of the Dinara Mountain Range

See also
List of mountains in Bosnia and Herzegovina

References

Mountains of Bosnia and Herzegovina